The Canton of Guillon is a former canton in the Department of Yonne, France. It had 2,879 inhabitants (2012). It was disbanded following the French canton reorganisation which came into effect in March 2015.

The canton comprised the following communes:

 Bierry-les-Belles-Fontaines
 Cisery
 Cussy-les-Forges
 Guillon
 Marmeaux
 Montréal
 Pisy
 Saint-André-en-Terre-Plaine
 Sainte-Magnance
 Santigny
 Sauvigny-le-Beuréal
 Savigny-en-Terre-Plaine
 Sceaux
 Thizy
 Trévilly
 Vassy
 Vignes

References

Former cantons of Yonne
2015 disestablishments in France
States and territories disestablished in 2015